Cinemax Comedy Experiment is an anthology series broadcast on Cinemax throughout the mid-to-late 1980s. Every episode was written and directed by a different standup comedian.

The series was known for giving full creative freedom to those comedians for their episodes, with Cinemax executives giving few to any notes against anything presented outside of remaining within the time slot. The series came out of a time in the history of cable television when comedy programs were considered premium content due to the high grosses of comedy films at the box office. The program was also an attempt on Cinemax's part to compete with the rising popularity of video stores which affected the network's subscription base and retention. 

Individuals who created "Experiments" include Harry Shearer, Chris Elliott, and Gilbert Gottfried; occasionally, non-standups were invited to contribute to the show, such as Garry Trudeau and Elizabeth Swados, who rewrote their off-Broadway show Rap Master Ronnie as an episode of the series. The Firesign Theatre adapted their album Eat Or Be Eaten as one episode.

Episodes

References

1980s American comedy television series
1980s American anthology television series
English-language television shows